"Hearts On Fire" is a song by Dutch duo The Common Linnets. The song was released in the Netherlands as a digital download on 31 August 2015 through Universal Music Group as the second single from their second studio album II (2015). The song peaked at number 120 on the Dutch Singles Chart.

Music video
A music video to accompany the release of "Hearts On Fire" was first released onto YouTube on 31 August 2015 at a total length of three minutes and forty-seven seconds.

Track listing

Charts

Weekly charts

Release history

References

2014 songs
2015 singles
The Common Linnets songs
Universal Music Group singles
Songs written by Rob Crosby